This is a list of aviation-related events from 1924:

Events 
 Violating the Treaty of Versailles, Germany establishes a secret training base for German pilots at Lipetsk in the Soviet Union. More than 450 German personnel will train there over the next ten years.
 Following a military revolt, Brazil abolishes Brazilian Army and Brazilian Navy control of aviation and places all military aviation units under the direct control of the general staff.
 The Tachikawa Aircraft Company Ltd. is founded at Tachikawa, Japan.

January 
 January 29 – Pateras Pesara flies an experimental helicopter in Paris. The machine flies 800 metres (2,640 ft) in just over 10 minutes.

February 
 February 20 – Three French Army officers make the first two-way aerial crossing of the Sahara Desert in a Breguet 14.

March 
 The admirals′ committee of the Regia Marina (Italian Royal Navy) considers an objection to the construction of aircraft carriers based on the observation that launching 40 planes from a carrier at present takes three hours, decides that the use of several carriers would solve the problem, and recommends that Italy construct at least two carriers.
 The Cierva C.6 makes a 10.5-kilometer (7-mile) flight in Spain from Cuatro Vientos airfield to Getafe airfield. The eight-minute flight is considered a major step forward in the development of autogiros and, by extension, of rotary-wing aircraft in general.
 March 1 – The Royal Air Force renames its Marine and Armament Experimental Establishment as the Marine Aircraft Experimental Establishment.
 March 25 – Squadron Leader Archibald Stuart Charles Stuart-MacLaren, Flying Officer William Noble Plenderleith, Sergeant W. H. Andrews of the Royal Air Force set off from Calshot in a Vickers Vulture II in an eastbound attempt to circumnavigate the world. Their attempt ultimately will fail on August 4 in the Commander Islands in the Bering Sea.

April 
 During the month, the International Commission for Aviation passes a resolution stating that "women shall be excluded from any employment in the operating crew of an aircraft engaged in public transport." A concern of the era is that women would have difficulty controlling an aircraft while menstruating.
 April 1
Imperial Airways is formed, with the backing of the British government.
Flights of Royal Air Force aircraft operating from Royal Navy ships are given the collective title "Fleet Air Arm of the Royal Air Force." This will later be shortened to "Fleet Air Arm."
The Government of Canada approves the title "Royal" for the Canadian Air Force, establishing the new Royal Canadian Air Force (RCAF). In addition to its military duties, the RCAF takes over the responsibility for the control and regulation of all civil aviation in Canada.
 April 6 – Four United States Army Air Service Douglas World Cruisers depart Seattle, Washington, beginning a six-month westbound journey which will culminate in the first aerial circumnavigation of the world.
 April 7 – Portuguese Commander Brito Pais and Captain Sarmento de Beires depart Lisbon eastbound in the Breguet 16.Bn2 Patria, beginning an attempt to fly around the world. They will crash Patria in India, but will continue in the de Havilland DH.9A Patria II before being forced to end their attempt in June in China, a short walk from its border with Hong Kong.
 April 24 – French Captain Georges Pelletier d'Oisy and Adjutant Lucien Besin depart Paris eastbound in a Breguet 19.A.2, beginning an attempt to fly around the world. They will be forced to end their attempt in May in Shanghai.
 April 26 – Imperial Airways makes its first scheduled flight, from Croydon Aerodrome to Paris, using a de Havilland DH.34.
 Apr 30 – Regular Belfast–Liverpool airmail flights are inaugurated by Alan Cobham, using de Havilland DH.50 craft.

May 
 May 17 – During its first aerial circumnavigation of the world, the westbound United States Army Air Service flight of Douglas World Cruisers arrive in northern Japan, completing the first crossing of the Pacific Ocean by airplane.
 May 19 – The first aerial circumnavigation of Australia is carried out, by a Royal Australian Air Force crew in a Fairey IIID.
 May 20 – French Captain Georges Pelletier d'Oisy and Adjutant Lucien Besin crash their Breguet 19.A.2 on a golf course in Shanghai, ending their attempt to fly around the world eastbound. They had covered 10,580 miles (17,037 km) in 26 days since leaving Paris.

June 
 Flying the Nieuport-Delage NiD 42S, the French pilot Joseph Sadi-Lecointe wins the Coupe Beaumont race as the only finisher, then continues flying to establish a new world speed-over-distance record over a distance of 500 km (310.69 miles), averaging 306.696 km/hr (190.572 mph).
Ludovic Arrachart wins the Michelin Cup long-distance flying competition.
 June 16 – The Royal Air Force′s Marine Aircraft Experimental Establishment moves from Isle of Grain, Kent, to the former Seaplane Experimental Station at Felixstowe, Suffolk.
 June 23 – Lieutenant Russell Maughan makes the first one-day crossing of the United States, completing the flight from Long Island, New York, to San Francisco, California, in a Curtiss PW-8 in 21 hours 48 minutes.
 June 24
In Shenzhen, close to the China-Hong Kong border, Portuguese Commander Brito Pais and Captain Sarmento de Beires give up on their eastbound attempt to circumnavigate the world in the de Havilland DH.9A Patria II after covering 11,000 miles (17,713 km) from Lisbon.
The Regia Aeronautica (Italian Royal Air Force) has 1,181 aircraft, of which 748 are combat-ready.
 June 25 – Westbound from Rangoon to Akyab, the United States Army Air Service flight of Douglas World Cruisers attempting the first aerial circumnavigation of the world unknowingly flies over the Vickers Vulture II amphibian of the Royal Air Force team of MacLaren, Plenderleith, and Andrews, which is sheltering in a coastal bay in Burma while eastbound from Akyab to Rangoon during its own attempt at a circumnavigation.

July 
 July 1 – Regular night airmail services commence in the United States, linking Chicago, Illinois, with Cheyenne, Wyoming.
 July 10 – Japanese aircraft sink a ship for the first time, when Imperial Japanese Navy bombers use level bombing from an average height of 1,000 meters (3,281 feet) over the course of four hours to sink the retired coast defense battleship Iwami off Yokosuka.
 July 17 – French Captain Georges Pelletier d'Oisy completes a flight from Paris to Tokyo, using a Breguet 14 borrowed from the Republic of China government after the May crash of his Breguet 19.A.2 at Shanghai. The journey from Paris takes 120 hours in the air over 84 days.

August 
 The Bolivian Air Force is formed, as the Cuerpo de Aviación ("Aviation Corps").
 The Regia Aeronautica (Italian Royal Air Force) participates in the first large-scale Regia Marina (Italian Royal Navy) maneuvers since 1910. The air force aircraft are tasked to conduct surveillance in coastal waters, reconnoiter enemy bases, and strike enemy ships that come within range. The air force is hampered by poor communications with the navy, the grounding of its airships – necessary for reconnaissance at ranges of more than 100 miles (161 km) – due to weather, and difficulty in distinguishing between ship types and between friendly and enemy ships. In a final fiasco, the "Red" fleet "torpedoes" the "Blue" fleet's flagship, the battleship Andrea Doria, as the "Blue" fleet enters port at Augusta, Sicily, at the end of the maneuvers after the "Blue" fleet's air escort breaks formation to overfly the fleet in a celebratory pass.
 August 4 – The attempt of the Royal Air Force team of MacLaren, Plenderleith, and Andrews to circumnavigate the world eastbound ends when they are forced down in the Bering Sea by fog and their Vickers Vulture amphibian is irreparably damaged. They taxi to safety at Bering Island in the Commander Islands. They had covered 13,100 miles (21,095 km) in 130 days.
 August 8 – The U.S. Navy dirigible  docks with the airship tender  while the Patoka is underway off Newport, Rhode Island, showing that airships could operate from support ships far out to sea.
 August 24 – The U.S. Navy light cruiser  rescues the crew of an Italian flying boat that is forced down in the Arctic Ocean by bad weather.
 August 31 – Six United States Army Air Service aviators flying Douglas World Cruisers arrive in Labrador, completing the transatlantic leg of their first aerial circumnavigation of the world.

September 
 September 3 – A United States Army Air Service pilot sets a speed record for a flight from Boston, Massachusetts, to New York City, completing the trip in 58 minutes.
 September 11 – Canada's first regular airmail service begins, with Laurentide Air Services linking Haileybury, Ontario, with Rouyn, Quebec.
 September 27-October 4 – The Daily Mail sponsors the Two-Seater Dual-Control Light Aeroplane Competition at Lympne Aerodrome in Lympne, England, the second of the three light airplane trials held there. Maurice Piercey wins in the Beardmore Wee Bee.
 September 28 – Greeted by 50,000 people and a congratulatory telegram from President Calvin Coolidge, two of the original four United States Army Air Service Douglas World Cruisers that had set out from Seattle, Washington, on April 6 arrive in Seattle, completing the first aerial circumnavigation of the world. Their westbound journey had covered 27,534 miles (44,338 km) in 371 hours in the air, taking 175 days. They have made 57 hops during the trip, averaging 483 miles (778 km) per hop, and visited 25 U.S. states and 21 foreign countries.

October 
 October 1 – The fourth annual Air League Challenge Cup race takes place over a 100-mile (161-kilometer) triangular course beginning and ending at Lympne Airport in Lympne, Kent, England. Three flights, each consisting of three Sopwith Snipes flown by Royal Air Force pilots, participate; one flight represents No. 25 Squadron at RAF Hawkinge, another No. 32 Squadron at RAF Kenley, and the third No. 56 Squadron at RAF Biggin Hill. Each flight flies the race in formation. No. 25 Squadron's flight finishes third with a time of 59 minutes 7.4 seconds, but is declared the winner when the other two flights are disqualified for cutting the western turning point and therefore failing to fly the entire course. The race is not held again until 1927.
 October 9 – In the United Kingdom, the Royal Auxiliary Air Force is established.
 October 12–15 – The Luftschiffbau Zeppelin-built dirigible LZ 126 is flown from Friederichshafen, Germany, nonstop to the Lakehurst, New Jersey, in the United States under guidance of Hugo Eckener for delivery to the U.S. Navy as a World War I war reparation. It is the longest nonstop airship flight in history at the time, covering 5,060 miles (8,148 km) in 81 hours and passing over the Azores, the Dominion of Newfoundland, and New York City along the way.
 October 18 – Italian World War I ace and aviation pioneer Giovanni Ancillotto dies in an automobile accident in Caravaggio, Lombardy, Italy.

November 
 Twenty-two of Brazils 39 naval pilots are arrested for antigovernment activity.
 November 2 – The Pitcairn Flying School and Passenger Service is formed. It later will become Eastern Airlines.
 November 11 – Lieutenant Dixie Kiefer makes the first night catapult launch from a ship, the U.S. Navy battleship .
 November 24 – A KLM Fokker F.VII makes the first flight from the Netherlands to the Dutch East Indies, taking 127 hours 16 minutes.

December 
 December 12 – The Cierva C.6 autogyro makes the first cross-country flight by a rotary-wing aircraft, piloted by Captain Joaquín Loriga the 10.5 km (7 statute miles) from Cuatro Vientos airfield to Getafe, Spain, in eight minutes.
 December 13 – In an early parasite fighter experiment, Lieutenant Clyde Flinter unsuccessfully attempts to dock his Sperry Messenger with the United States Army airship TC-3.
 December 14 – A Martin MO-1 is launched using an explosive-driven catapult fitted to a turret on the U.S. Navy battleship , requiring less distance than ever for the take-off.
 December 24 – Imperial Airways de Havilland DH.34 G-EBBX crashes at Purley, Surrey, in the United Kingdom, shortly after takeoff from Croydon Airport, killing all eight people on board.  It is Imperial Airways first fatal accident, and as a result of a public inquiry into the disaster Croydon Airport is expanded to absorb almost all of Beddington Aerodrome.

First flights 
 Avia BH-10 (Czech air arm designation Avia B.10)
 Avia BH-12
 Avia BH-17
 Avro 562 Avis 
 Latécoère 14
 Levasseur PL.5
 Levasseur PL.6
 Potez 25
 Potez 27
 Thomas-Morse TM-23
 Summer 1924 – Latécoère 6
 Mid-1924 – Avro 557 Ava

January 
 Grigorovich I-1

February 
 February 18 – Latécoère 5

March 
 Cierva C.6
 Fairey Fawn

April 
 Farman F.140 Super Goliath

May 
 May 4 – Sikorsky S-29-A
 May 9 – Westland Dreadnought
 May 26 – Tupolev ANT-2
 May 30 – Marinens Flyvebaatfabrikk M.F.8

June 
 June 16 – Blériot-SPAD S.51
 June 23 – Focke-Wulf A 16
 June 28 – Avro 561 Andover

July 
 July 19 – Blériot 135

August 
 Savoia-Marchetti S.55
 Hawker Cygnet
 Potez 26
 August 21 – Fokker F.VII

September 
 Aero A.24
 September 4 – Curtiss F4C-1
 September 14 – Westland Woodpigeon
 September 19 – Junkers G.24, also known as Junkers G.23
 September 22 – Westland Widgeon

October 
 October 4 – Curtiss XPW-8A, predecessor of the XPW-8B, prototype in turn of the Curtiss P-1 Hawk

November 
 Kawanishi K-7 Transport Seaplane
 November 4 – Grigorovich I-2
 November 6 – Dornier Do J
 November 24 – Fokker F.VII

Entered service 

 Grigorovich M-24 with Soviet Naval Aviation
 Mitsubishi B1M with Imperial Japanese Navy
 Autumn 1924 – Breguet 19 (A.2 reconnaissance variant; first operational variant) with the  32e, 33e, 34e, and 35e Régiments d'Aviation of the French Armys Aéronautique Militaire

May
 Armstrong Whitworth Siskin III with No. 41 Squadron, Royal Air Force

July
 Avro 549 Aldershot with No. 99 Squadron, Royal Air Force

References 

 Isaacs, Keith. "The Fairey IIID In Australia". Air Enthusiast, Number 24, April–June 1984. Bromley, Kent, UK:Pilot Press. ISSN 0143-5450. pp. 40–49.

 
Aviation by year